Bay Islands Sign Language, also known as French Harbour Sign Language, is an indigenous village sign language of Honduras. It started in the village of French Harbour on the island of Roatán and spread to the neighbouring island of Guanaja.

There is a high incidence of Usher syndrome in French Harbour, which causes deafness and then blindness as well later in life. Because of this, BISL has developed both visual and tactile modes.

References

External links
Ben Braithwaite, Documenting language across modalities: visual and tactile sign language in the Bay Islands. Data deposit.

Village sign languages
Sign languages of Honduras
Deafblindness